Marian Daniel Stoenac (born 30 October 1993) is a Romanian professional footballer who plays as a midfielder for Viitorul Târgu Jiu.

Honours
Minerul Motru
Liga III: 2012–13

ACS Șirineasa
Liga III: 2017–18

Juventus București
Liga III: 2015–16

FC U Craiova 1948
Liga II: 2020–21
Liga III: 2019–20

References

External links
 
 

1993 births
Living people
Romanian footballers
Association football midfielders
Liga I players
Liga II players
Liga III players
CS Minerul Motru players
ASC Daco-Getica București players
CSM Deva players
ACS Viitorul Târgu Jiu players
FC U Craiova 1948 players
FC Politehnica Iași (2010) players